George Kay is an English screenwriter. He wrote and co-created the international Netflix series Criminal and Netflix series Lupin, and he wrote and executive produced the 2022 television series Litvinenko. He has also written on television series including Stag, My Mad Fat Diary, The Hour, The Tunnel and the first season of Killing Eve.

Whilst a teenage student at Wellington College, Berkshire, Kay met director Jim Field Smith, with whom he often collaborates.

Kay and Field Smith co-created Criminal. The second series of the UK version was nominated for two BAFTA Awards.

Whilst writing the script for Litvinenko, Kay had access to transcripts of Alexander Litvinenko’s 18 hours of deathbed interviews with the Metropolitan Police. Litvinenko’s widow, Marina, and the Metropolitan Police supported the production of the series. The series sold to over 80 international territories.

Idris Elba will star in Kay and Field Smith’s Apple TV+ thriller Hijack.

References 

Living people
Year of birth missing (living people)